Isaac Curtis-Harris (born 13 October 1997) is an English rugby union player who plays for London Irish in the Premiership Rugby.

References

External links
London Irish Profile
ESPN Profile
Ultimate Rugby Profile

1997 births
Living people
English rugby union players
Rugby union players from Hampshire
Rugby union flankers